Lala Band (stylized as LaLa Band) were a Romanian pop-rock band formed by MediaPro Music in Bucharest in 2011. The group was formed through a casting system held by MediaPro Music in February 2011 and 21 people were chosen to form Lala Band.

Lala Band debuted, at the same time when their TV series, Pariu cu viața, premiered on 12 September 2011, on Pro TV. After Pariu cu viața ended on 12 June 2013, a spin-off series was made as O nouă viață, which has aired on Acasă, from 17 February to 17 April 2014.

The group went successful in 2011, 2012 and 2013. The group disbanded shortly after O nouă viață ended. At the time of the disbandment, it only consisted of 12 members, who are Dorian Popa, Alina Eremia, Cristina Ciobănașu, Vlad Gherman, Sore Mihalache, Raphael Tudor, Alexia Talavutis, Dima Trofim, Bubu Cernea, Gabriel Ciocan, Ana Banciu and Alex Nicolae.

Members

Final members 
 Dorian Popa (2011–2014)
 Alina Eremia (2011–2014)
 Cristina Ciobănașu (2011–2014)
 Vlad Gherman (2011–2014)
 Sore Mihalache (2011–2014)
 Rapha Tudor (2011–2014)
 Alexia Talavutis (2011–2014)
 Dima Trofim (2011–2014)
 Bubu Cernea (2011–2014)
 Gabriel Ciocan (2011–2014)
 Ana Baniciu (2012–2014)
 Alex Nicolae (2013–2014)

Former members 
 Oana Stancu (2011–2012)
 Bianca Dragomir (2011–2012)
 Georgiana Drumen (2011–2012)
 Monica Odagiu (2011–2012)
 Andrei Ștefan (2011–2012)
 Costin Cambir (2011–2013)
 Gloria Melu (2011–2013)
 Mihai Mițitescu (2011–2013)
 Andrada Popa (2011–2013)
 Levent Sali (2011–2013)
 Liviu Teodorescu (2012–2013)

Timeline

Discography

Studio albums

Singles

Filmography 
Pariu cu viața (2011–2013)
O nouă viață (2014)

Awards

References 

English-language singers from Romania
Pop rock groups
Romanian pop music groups
Romanian rock music groups
Romanian dance musical groups
Musical groups established in 2011
Musical groups disestablished in 2014
2011 establishments in Romania
Musical groups from Bucharest